Jim Dempsey (born 5 November 1946) is a Scottish former football player and manager.

As a player Dempsey, who was known as a hard man, was most associated with Hamilton Academical, with whom he had two spells, and Raith Rovers, although he also turned out for Stirling Albion, Albion Rovers and Larkhall Thistle.

He had a sole season back as manager at Hamilton, following the departure of John Lambie to Partick Thistle, although the club finished far adrift at the foot of the Scottish Premier Division and he was dismissed. He was subsequently announced as manager of Fauldhouse United in 1992 and later returned to the Accies as assistant boss under Chris Hillcoat in 2003.

References

1946 births
Living people
Scottish footballers
Hamilton Academical F.C. players
Raith Rovers F.C. players
Stirling Albion F.C. players
Scottish football managers
Albion Rovers F.C. players
Hamilton Academical F.C. managers
Larkhall Thistle F.C. players
Scottish Football League players
Scottish Football League managers
Association football central defenders